Clypeorhagus is a genus of beetles belonging to the family Eucnemidae.

The species of this genus are found in Northern Europe.

Species:
 Clypeorhagus clypeatus (Hampe, 1850)

References

Eucnemidae
Beetle genera